Hafedh Dakhlaoui (born January 20, 1986, La Marsa, Tunisia) is a French actor born in Tunisia and based in Sydney.

Early life and career 
Dakhlaoui was born in La Marsa, Tunisia, for Tunisian swimming champion parents and started his acting career in an early age through participating in his school theater, at the age of 15 participated in Nadia and Sarra, a French-Tunisian film directed by Moufida Tlatli. In 2014, Dakhlaoui appeared in Black Rose, a Russian-American action film as max. In 2014, he played the role of Cole's Bodyguard in Showdown in Manila which was filmed in the Philippines. In 2015, Dakhlaoui appeared in Maximum Impact directed by Andrzej Bartkowiak. In 2019, he appeared in Wild League where he played Alexander. In 2020, he starred in Octopus Pot with Mykel Shannon Jenkins, played the lead role in the movie They called me Keith And the role of Walker in The Spy Who Never Dies.

Filmography

References

External links 
 Official website
 

1986 births
Living people
French male film actors
French people of Tunisian descent
People from Tunis